Zenaga (autonym:  or ) is a Berber language on the verge of extinction currently spoken in Mauritania and northern Senegal by a few hundred people. Zenaga Berber is spoken as a mother tongue from the town of Mederdra in southwestern Mauritania to the Atlantic coast and in northern Senegal. The language is recognized by the Mauritanian government.

It shares its basic linguistic structure with other Berber idioms in Morocco and Algeria, but specific features are quite different. In fact, Zenaga is probably the most divergent surviving Berber language, with a significantly different sound system made even more distant by sound changes such as  >  and  >  as well as a difficult-to-explain profusion of glottal stops.

The name Zenaga comes from that of a much larger ancient Berber tribe, the Iznagen (Iẓnagen), who are known in Arabic as the Sanhaja. Adrian Room's African Placenames gives Zenaga derivations for some place-names in Mauritania.

Demographics
Zenaga is a language descended from the Sanhaja confederation who ruled over much of North Africa during the early Middle Ages. Zenaga was once spoken throughout Mauritania and beyond but fell into decline when its speakers were defeated by the invading Maqil Arabs in the Char Bouba war of the 17th century. After this war, they were forbidden to bear arms and variously became either specialists in Islamic religious scholarship or servants to more powerful tribes. It was among the former, more prestigious group that Zenaga survived longest.

In 1940 (Dubié 1940), Zenaga was spoken by about 13,000 people belonging to four nomadic tribes distributed in an area roughly bounded by Saint-Louis, Podor, Boutilimit and Nouakchott (but including none of these cities):
 ('the five'): 4,653 speakers out of 12,000 members
 ('i-D-ab-lahs-en'): 5,000 out of 5,000
 ('i-Kumleil-en'), subtribe of the Ida u el Hadj: 700 (out of Ida u el Hadj population of 4,600)
: 2,889 out of 8,500

These tribes, according to Dubié, traditionally specialised in Islamic religious scholarship and led a nomadic lifestyle, specialising in sheep and cows (camel-herding branches of the same tribes had already switched to Arabic). Even then, many speakers were shifting to Hassaniya Arabic, the main Arabic variety spoken in Mauritania, and all were bilingual. Zenaga was used only within the tribe, and it was considered impolite to speak it when non-speakers were present; some speakers deliberately avoided using Zenaga with their children, hoping to give them a head start in Hassaniya.

Half a century later, the number of speakers is reportedly around 2,000. While Zenaga appears to be nearing extinction, Hassaniya Arabic contains a substantial number of Zenaga loanwords (more than 10% of the vocabulary).

Dialects
There are significant dialectal differences within Zenaga, notably between the Id-ab-lahsen and Tendgha dialects.

References

Further reading
 Al-Chennafi M. & Norris H. T., "How the Hassaniyya vernacular of Mauritania supplanted Zenaga" - The Maghreb-Review 76 (5-6), 1981. pp : 77–78.
 Basset, André. 1933b. 'Note sur les parlers zenaga'. In Bulletin du Comité d'études historiques et scientifiques de l'Afrique Occidentale Française; 1933, pp. 319–32.
 Basset, René. 1909. "Mission au Senegal". Bulletin de correspondence africaine; 39. Paris: Leroux.
 Cohen, David & Taine-Cheikh, Catherine. 2000. 'À propos du zénaga. Vocalisme et morphologie verbale en berbère'. Bulletin de la Société de linguistique de Paris XCV/1, pp. 267–319.
 Dubié, Paul (1940). "L'îlot berbérophone de Mauritanie", Bulletin de l'IFAN; 2, pp. 315–325.
 Faidherbe, Louis L. 1877. Le Zenaga des tribus Senegalaises. Paris.
 Kossmann, Maarten. 2001. 'L’origine du vocalisme en zénaga de Mauritanie', pp. 83–95 of Ibriszimow, Dymitr & Vossen, Rainer (eds.). 2001. Etudes berbères. Actes du " 1. Bayreuth-Frankfurter Kolloquium zur Berberologie " (Frankfurter Afrikanistische Blätter, 13.), Köln : Rüdiger Köppe.
 Kossmann, Maarten. 2001. 'The Origin of the Glottal Stop in Zenaga and its Reflexes in the other Berber Languages'. Afrika und Übersee; 84, pp. 61–100.
 Masqueray, Émile. 1879. 'Comparaison d’un vocabulaire des Zenaga avec les vocabulaires correspondents des dialectes Chawia et des Beni Mzab'. Archives des missions scientifiques et litteraires 3/5: 473–533.
 Nicolas, Francis. 1953. La langue berbère de Mauritanie, (Dakar, mémoire de l'IFAN, n° 33).
 Ould Cheikh, Abdel Wedoud. 2008. " Les communautés zénagophones aujourd'hui ", [Avant-propos] pp. XV-XXXIII, in: Catherine Taine-Cheikh, "Dictionnaire zénaga-français. Le berbère de Mauritanie présenté par racines dans une perspective comparative", (Berber Studies n° 20). XCIX + 650 p. Köln: Rüdiger Köppe Verlag, 
 Taine-Cheikh, Catherine (with Yaha Ould El Bara). 1997. " Le vocalisme du berbère zénaga de Mauritanie – premiers résultats d'une analyse acoustique ", Actes des Journées d'Etudes Linguistiques : "La voyelle dans tous ses états", Nantes (5 et 6 décembre 1997), pp. 80–85.
 Taine-Cheikh, Catherine. 1999. " Le zénaga de Mauritanie à la lumière du berbère commun ", Éd. Marcello Lamberti et Livia Tonelli, Afroasiatica Tergestina. Papers from the 9th Italian Meeting of Afro-Asiatic (Hamito-Semitic) Linguistics, Trieste, 23–24 April 1998, Padova, UNIPRESS, pp. 299–324, 
 Taine-Cheikh, Catherine. 2002. " Morphologie et morphogenèse des diminutifs en zenaga (berbère de Mauritanie) ", Éd. Kamal Nait-Zerrad, Articles de linguistique berbère. Mémorial Werner Vycichl, Paris: L'Harmattan, ; p. 427-454,
 Taine-Cheikh, Catherine. 2003. " L'adjectif et la conjugaison suffixale en berbère ", Éd. Jérôme Lentin, Antoine Lonnet, Mélanges David Cohen. Études sur le langage, les langues, les dialectes, les littératures, offertes par ses élèves, ses collègues, ses amis, Paris: Maisonneuve & Larose, ; pp. 661–74
 Taine-Cheikh, Catherine. 2003. " La corrélation de gémination consonantique en zénaga (berbère de Mauritanie) ", Comptes rendus du GLECS; n° 34 (1998–2002), pp. 5–66.
 Taine-Cheikh, Catherine. 2004. " Les verbes à finale laryngale en zénaga ", Éd. K. Nait-Zerrad, R. Vossen, D. Ibriszimow, Nouvelles études berbères. Le verbe et autres articles. Actes du "2. Bayreuth-Frankfurter Kolloquium zur Berberologie", Köln: Rüdiger Köppe Verlag ; pp. 171–90
 Taine-Cheikh, Catherine 2005. " Le problème des verbes dérivés en berbère et l'exemple du zénaga ", Éd. P. Fronzarolli & P. Marrassini, Quaderni di Semitistica. Proceedings of the 10th Meeting of Hamito-Semitic (Afroasiatic) Linguistics (Florence, 18–20 April 2001), n° 25, pp. 391–409.
 Taine-Cheikh, Catherine. 2005. " Les marques de 1ère personne en berbère. Réflexions à partir des données du zénaga ", Éd. A. Mengozzi, Studi Afroasiatici. XI Incontro Italiano di Linguistica Camitosemitica, Milano, Franco Angeli, pp. 97–112.
 Taine-Cheikh, Catherine. 2005. " Du rôle de la quantité vocalique en morphogénie. Réflexions à partir de l'arabe et du berbère de Mauritanie ", Faits de Langues n° 26 [special issue on Hamito=Semitic languages (afro-asiatiques, vol. 1), Éd. A. Lonnet & A. Mettouchi], Paris, Ophrys, pp. 41–63.
 Taine-Cheikh, Catherine. 2005. " Le rôle des phénomènes d'agglutination dans la morphogenèse de l'arabe et du berbère, éd. G. Lazard & C. Moyse, Linguistique typologique [Actes du 3ème colloque "Typologie des langues et universaux linguistiques", Paris, 18-19 novembre 2002], Lille: Presses du Septentrion, pp. 288–315.
 Taine-Cheikh, Catherine. 2005. " Moyen et réfléchi: typologie comparée de l’arabe et du berbère (exemples mauritaniens) ", Matériaux arabes et sudarabiques (GELLAS) [2003-2005. "En hommage à Omar Bencheikh (1940-2005)"], n° 11 (nouvelle série), Paris, pp. 37–52.
 Taine-Cheikh, Catherine. 2005. " Les numéraux en berbère. Le cas du zénaga ", Éd. A. M. Di Tolli, Studi Maġribini Nuova Serie, vol. 3 (2005 "Studi Berberi e Mediterranei. Miscellanea offerta in onore di Luigi Serra"), Napoli: Università degli Studi di Napoli "L'Orientale", pp. 269–280.
 Taine-Cheikh, Catherine. 2006. " Alternances vocaliques et affixations dans la morphologie nominale du berbère: le pluriel en zénaga ", Éd. R. Vossen et D. Ibriszimow, Études berbères III. Le nom, le pronom et autres articles, (Berber Studies; n° 14) Köln: R. Köppe Verlag; pp. 253–267.
 Taine-Cheikh, Catherine. 2007. " Les propositions relatives en zénaga et la question des relateurs en berbère ", Éd. M. Moriggi, XII Incontro Italiano di Linguistici Camito-semitica (Afroasiatica). Atti, Rubbettino: Medioevo Romanzo e Orientale, pp. 301–310.
 Taine-Cheikh, Catherine. 2007. " Voix moyenne et variations d'actance: le réfléchi en arabe et en berbère (exemples de Mauritanie) ", Éd. A. Rousseau, D. Bottineau et D. Roulland, L'énoncé réfléchi", Rennes: Presses Universitaires de Rennes, pp. 321–342.
 Taine-Cheikh, Catherine. 2007. " Périphérie géographique et perméabilité aux contacts. Le cas du Maghreb ", Romano-Arabica, n° 6-7 (2006-2007 "Peripheral Arabic Dialects", Éd. George Grigore), pp. 159–178.
 Taine-Cheikh, Catherine. 2008. " Les verbes dérivés à préfixe "S" en berbère: le cas du zénaga, entre grammaire et lexique ",Éd. G. Takács, Semito-Hamitic Festschrift for A. B. Dolgopolsky and H. Jungraithmayr, Berlin: Dietrich Reimer Verlag, pp. 284-309.
 Taine-Cheikh, Catherine. 2008. "Arabe(s) et berbère en contact: le cas mauritanien ", Éd. M. Lafkioui & V. Brugnatelli, Berber in Contact. Linguistic and Sociolinguistic Perspectives - Le berbère en contact. Études en linguistique et sociolinguistique (Berber Studies; n° 22). Köln: Rüdiger Köppe Verlag, ; pp. 113–139,
 Taine-Cheikh, Catherine, "Dictionnaire zénaga-français. Le berbère de Mauritanie présenté par racines dans une perspective comparative", (Berber Studies; n° 20, 2008) Köln: Rüdiger Köppe Verlag, XCIX + 650 p. [avec un avant-propos d'Abdel Wedoud Ould Cheikh], 
 Taine-Cheikh, Catherine. 2009. " La lexicographie du zénaga et le problème de classement par racines ", Éd. R. Vossen, D. Ibriszimow & H.J. Stroomer, Etudes berbères IV. Essais lexicologiques et lexicographiques et autres articles. Actes du "4. Bayreuth-Frankfurt-Leidener Kolloquium zur Berberologie", 21-23 septembre 2006. (Berber Studies; n° 25). Köln: Rüdiger Köppe Verlag , pp. 231–247,
 Taine-Cheikh, Catherine. 2009. " Les morphèmes de futur en arabe et en berbère. Réflexions pour une typologie ", Faits de Langues; n° 33 [special issue on the future], Paris: Ophrys, pp. 91–102.
 Taine-Cheikh, Catherine. 2009. " L'aoriste en zénaga : Contribution à l'étude des aspects en berbère ", Éd. S. Chaker, A. Mettouchi et G. Philippson, Études de phonétique et linguistique berbères. Hommage à Naïma LOUALI (1961-2005), Paris: Peeters [series: SELAF n° 452, Maghreb-Sahara n° 23], pp. 231–249.
 Taine-Cheikh, Catherine. 2009. " À propos de l'expression de l'état en zénaga. Apophonie et sous-catégorisation verbale en berbère et en arabe ", Éd. S. Baldi, Studi Maġribini Nuova Serie, vol. VII ("International Afro-Asiatic Congress. 11th–13th September 2008", at the University of Naples "L'Orientale", Italy, ed. by ), pp. 95–109.
 Taine-Cheikh, Catherine. 2010. "Dictionnaire français–zénaga (berbère de Mauritanie). Avec renvois au classement par racines du Dictionnaire zénaga–français", Berber Studies n° 27, Köln, Rüdiger Köppe Verlag, XIV + 326 p., 
 Taine-Cheikh, Catherine. 2010. " Ordre, injonction, souhait et serment en zénaga (étude comparative) ", Éd. H. J. Stroomer / M. Kossmann / D. Ibriszimow / R. Vossen, "Etudes berbères V. Essais sur des variations dialectales et autres articles", Köln, Rüdiger Köppe Verlag, Berber Studies n° 28, pp. 191–212, 
 Taine-Cheikh, Catherine. 2010. " The role of the Berber deictic ad and TAM markers in dependent clauses in Zenaga ", Éd. I. Bril (éd.), "Clause Linking and Clause Hierarchy. Syntax and pragmatics", Amsterdam / Philadelphia, John Benjamins Publishing Company, pp. 355–398.
 Taine-Cheikh, Catherine. 2010. " Aux origines de la culture matérielle des nomades de Mauritanie. Réflexions à partir des lexiques arabes et berbères ". "The Maghreb Review" ["Spécial issue on Mauritania", Part 1, Éd. P. Bonte et S. Boulay], 35 (n° 1–2), pp. 64–88.

Berbers in Mauritania
Berbers in Senegal
Western Berber languages
Languages of Mauritania
Languages of Senegal
Endangered languages of Africa
Verb–subject–object languages
Endangered Afroasiatic languages